Francia is a 2009 Argentine film directed by Uruguayan Adrián Caetano, starring Natalia Oreiro.

References

External links

2009 films
Argentine comedy-drama films
2000s Argentine films